Exeter College of Art and Design was an art college based in Exeter, Devon. Founded in 1854, it amalgamated with what would become Plymouth University in 1989.

The main building was located at Earl Richards Road North Exeter from the 1970s with some facilities based at Barts until the early 1980s. Graphics was based on Gandy Street in the old School of Art buildings until it relocated to the main site in 1984. The Printmaking department was initially located at The Mint.
The Art College offered higher education courses including Foundation, BA (Hons) and Combination courses with the University of Exeter as well as MA/Pg diplomas.
Disciplines were, Fine Art Ceramics, Graphics, Painting, Printmaking, Photography, Sculpture and 4D (Film, Video, Sound).

The Priory Press was introduced by Alan Richards and Bernard Beard in association with The Bartholomew Print Workshop in the 1960s and produces limited edition handmade printed books.

History
The School of Art was founded in Exeter in 1854 as part of the Royal Albert Memorial Museum and promoted by Edward Bowring Stephens a local sculptor.
In 1858 decorative designer Kent Kingdon offered a £5 prize  for a decorative design.

In 1951 The Exeter School of Art was renamed as the Exeter Central College of Art.

Clifford Fishwick (1923–1997) was appointed Painting Master in 1947 and was principal of the college from 1958 to 1984 a skilled painter having trained at Liverpool School of Art, he was a friend of Peter Lanyon and exhibited regularly with the Penwith Society of Arts. Fishwick is now regarded as an important, if underrated figure in post-war British painting and one of the better artists of the St Ives group.

In 1966 students print work was featured in an exhibition entitled "An Approach to Printmaking in Exeter" at The Whitechapel Gallery, London.
In 1973  the College was renamed again as Exeter College of Art and Design and a new building opened at Earl Richards Road North on the outskirts of Exeter.

In 1976 painting tutor John Butler set up The Spacex (art gallery) which became a registered educational charity in 1990.

The college amalgamated with Polytechnic South West based in Plymouth in 1989 and in 2007 the facilities moved permanently to the Plymouth Campus. In  2011 planning permission was granted to demolish and redevelop the site to provide 39 dwellings with parking and landscaping.

Tutors
Clifford Fishwick (Principal) 1958–84
Michael Mayer, (Head of Painting)
Brian Southwell (Head of Ceramics)
Lawson Rudge  (Ceramics)
Edward Allington (Fellow Ceramics) then Professor, Head of Graduate Sculpture at Slade School of Fine Art
Mike Bartlett (Head of 4D)
Chris Garret (4D, also Biff cartoons)
Lesley Kerman (Art History)
Mike Garton (Slade Dip.RWA) (Painting)
Marek Laczynski  (Printmaking)
Graham Clucas (Printmaking and Painting)
Mike Leggett (film)
Liz Nicol (Head of Photography)
Steve Berry (Photography and MATTA)
Steve Eastwood (MATTA)
Steve Thorpe (Printmaking)
Alan Richards (Painting, Head of Fine Art)
Bernard Beard (Head of Print at The Mint)
Tom Bates (Sculpture)
Roger Dean  (Head of Sculpture),
Margaret Dean
George V Stephenson (Senior Lecture, Sculpture and Fine Art) 1967-1988
Arthur Goodwin  (Painting, Head of Fine Art)
John Butler (Painting)
Jeremy Diggle (4D,MATTA) 1986–99, now Professor and Head of the School of Art, RMIT, Melbourne Australia
Katy Macleod (Critical Studies)
David O'Brien (Design History and Art History)
Mike Gorman (Painting)
Sam Smiles (Art History)
Ray Smith (Painting)
David Eddington (Painting Fellow) 1988–89
Alexander McNeish (Head of Painting)
Peter Stitt (Painting)
Mike Phillips (4D, Media Arts) 1987-1992
Michael Bull (sculpture)

Alumni
John Angel (1881–1960) sculptor 
Christian Birmingham illustrator 
Peter Bright artist and musician 
Penny Dale illustrator and writer of children's books.
Julian Dawson (b. 1954) singer songwriter author
Elaine M. Goodwin author and mosaic artist
Diana Jane Howse (b. 1956) visual arts specialist and wife of David Lascelles, 8th Earl of Harewood
Iain McKell fashion, portrait and social documentary photographer 
Chris Pig (b. 1965) printmaker 
Kev F. Sutherland (b. 1961) comedian and comic strip creator 
Keith Towler social worker 
Heather Tweed (b. 1959) visual artist 
Frederick John Widgery (1861–1942) landscapist and mayor of Exeter

References

External links
 Historical photos of the college
 Spacex Gallery website
 Exhibition catalogue written by Lesley Kerman
 2012 Artwork Installation by Sarah Bennett in the abandoned Art College building 

Art schools in England
Educational institutions established in 1854
Education in Exeter
Further education colleges in Devon
Buildings and structures in Exeter
Arts organizations established in 1854
1854 establishments in England